María Pina Tolosa, born in Valencia, on 8 August 1987, is a Spanish women's basketball 1.87 m small forward, who currently plays at Valencia Basket.

She made her debut in the Liga Femenina in season 2005-2006 with CB Estudiantes and has played in several clubs of the Spanish top division.

In 2016, Pina signed for Angers Basket, where she played for one year before coming back to Spain, playing for Gernika KESB in season 2017-18. She signed for her hometown club Valencia Basket for the 2018-19 season.

She has been a member of the Spanish National team on 41 occasions, with whom she played the 2006 FIBA World Championship for Women and two EuroBasket Women.

EuroLeague and EuroCup statistics

Awards and accomplishments

Spanish League: (1) 2012–13
Spanish Cup: (2) 2014, 2016
Spanish Supercup: (2) 2012, 2013

National team
Pina started playing with Spain's youth teams at 15, winning a total of three medals from 2003 to 2007. She made her debut with the senior team in 2006. Up to 2021, she had 41 caps with 2.4 PPG:
4th 2003 FIBA Europe Under-16 Championship (youth)
  2004 FIBA Europe Under-18 Championship (youth) 
  2005 FIBA Europe Under-18 Championship (youth) 
4th 2006 FIBA Europe Under-20 Championship (youth) 
  2007 FIBA Europe Under-20 Championship (youth) 
 8th 2006 World Championship
 9th 2011 Eurobasket
  2019 Eurobasket

References

External links 
Profile en FEB.es
Profile in fibaeurope.com

1987 births
Living people
Small forwards
Spanish women's basketball players